Seiichi Ueda (born 1 March 1899, date of death unknown) was a Japanese track and field athlete. He competed in the men's pentathlon at the 1924 Summer Olympics.

References

External links
 

1899 births
Year of death missing
Japanese pentathletes
Japanese male javelin throwers
Olympic male pentathletes
Olympic athletes of Japan
Athletes (track and field) at the 1924 Summer Olympics
Japan Championships in Athletics winners
19th-century Japanese people
20th-century Japanese people